Joseph Ripley Chandler (August 22, 1792 – July 10, 1880) was a Whig member of the U.S. House of Representatives from Pennsylvania.

Biography
Joseph R. Chandler was born in Kingston, Massachusetts.  He was engaged in commercial work in Boston, Massachusetts, and moved to Philadelphia, Pennsylvania, in 1815.  He founded a young ladies' seminary and worked as editor of the United States Gazette from 1822 to 1847.  He was a member of the Philadelphia City Council from 1832 to 1848, and a member of the State constitutional convention in 1837. For a short time, he was an editorial assistant at Graham's Magazine in 1848.

Chandler was elected as a Whig to the Thirty-first, Thirty-second, and Thirty-third Congresses.  He was an unsuccessful candidate for reelection in 1854.  He was appointed by President James Buchanan as Minister to the Two Sicilies and served from June 15, 1858, to November 15, 1860. 

He served as president of the board of directors of Girard College.  He became interested in prison reform and was a delegate to the International Prison Congress held at London in 1872.  He died in 1880 in Philadelphia, where he was interred in New Cathedral Cemetery.

References

Bibliography
Gerrity, Frank. "The Disruption of the Philadelphia Whigocracy: Joseph R. Chandler, Anti-Catholicism, and the Congressional Election of 1854." Pennsylvania Magazine, 111 (April 1987): 161–94.

Sources

The Political Graveyard

External links

Philadelphia City Council members
Ambassadors of the United States to the Kingdom of the Two Sicilies
19th-century American newspaper editors
1792 births
1880 deaths
Whig Party members of the United States House of Representatives from Pennsylvania
19th-century American politicians
19th-century American diplomats